Jools is a given name. Notable people with the name include:
Jools Holland (born 1958), English pianist, bandleader and television presenter
Jools Jameson (born 1968), British computer game developer
Jools Topp (born 1958), one half of New Zealand folk singing and activist sister comedy duo the Topp Twins
Jools Siviter, a character in the television series Spooks

Music 
 Jools (band), an English sextet from Leicester

See also
Jules